Anisolabis howarthi is a blind, troglobite species of earwig in the genus Anisolabis, the family Anisolabididae, the suborder Forficulina, and the order Dermaptera. The species is native to Hawaii, and was first classified by Brindle in 1979. According to a paper published by him in 1980 in the journal Pacific Insects, the species is first known true troglobite earwig; while there are other blind species that live underneath soil or humus, this is the first to actually inhabit a cave.

References 

Anisolabididae
Endemic fauna of Hawaii
Cave insects
Insects described in 1979